Final Solutions: Mass Killing and Genocide in the 20th Century is a 2003 book by Benjamin Valentino on the political factors of mass killing and genocide.

Bibliography

External links 

 

2003 non-fiction books
English-language books
Cornell University Press books
Genocide studies